Brennik  is a village in the administrative district of Gmina Złotoryja, within Złotoryja County, Lower Silesian Voivodeship, in southwestern Poland. It was located in Germany prior to 1945.

It is home to about 35,000 people.

History

Brennicki's history goes back to the 16th century; according to historical sources, Brennicki occupied as many as 6 villages before it became part of the German state after the creation of the German empire by Otto Von Bismarck

References

Villages in Złotoryja County